The CMLL World Heavyweight Championship (Campeonato Mundial Completo de CMLL in Spanish) is a singles professional wrestling championship promoted by Consejo Mundial de Lucha Libre (CMLL). The Championship has been in existence since 1991. Unlike other heavyweight titles such as the WWE Championship or the IWGP Heavyweight Championship, it is not the main championship in the promotion because CMLL has emphasized the lower weight levels since there are more workers in the lower levels. The title was the first to be created after Empresa Mexicana de la Lucha Libre changed its name to Consejo Mundial de Lucha Libre in the early 1990s.

As it is a professional wrestling championship, it is not won legitimately; it is instead won via a scripted ending to a match or awarded to a wrestler because of a storyline. As the championship is designated as a heavyweight title, it can only officially be competed for by wrestlers weighing at least . All title matches take place under two-out-of-three falls rules.

The first champion was Konnan El Barbaro, who won a 16-man tournament in 1991. The current champion is Gran Guerrero, who is in his first reign. He defeated Hechicero on November 7, 2022. The championship has been vacated three times; all instances were when the champion left CMLL for another promotion. Universo 2000 holds the record for most reigns, with three.

Title history

Combined reigns

Notes

References
General sources
[G]

External links
 CMLL World Heavyweight Title History at Cagematch.net

Consejo Mundial de Lucha Libre championships
CMLL World Heavyweight Championship